Basics is a solo album by the pianist Paul Bley, recorded in 2000 and released on the Justin Time label.

Reception 

The AllMusic review by Glenn Astarita stated: "Paul Bley intermingles askew phraseology with geometrically fabricated lines and endearing propositions. Recommended!". All About Jazz wrote that "like any other true artist, Bley continues to grow and investigate, and Basics shares the complexity of his thought conveyed through his medium of expression". Metro Times noted: "Still impressionistic, he's developed a more fluid approach, which makes listening to the unaccompanied instrument seem like less work than it used to be. His probing comes across as less portentous now, encased in a lyrical flow of playful sensuality". JazzTimes observed: "Although subtly shaded dynamics are a key feature of this disc, there's no denying Bley's percussive attack and firm tone, perhaps originally conceived to cut through the chatter in a noisy club".

Track listing
All compositions by Paul Bley except as indicated
 "Love Lost" - 4:41
 "Basics" - 2:29
 "Speed Kills" - 2:04
 "Told You So" - 9:15
 "Lucky" - 8:19
 "Chet" - 7:51
 "Walk Home" - 7:35
 "Blues Waltz" - 6:18
 "Monk's Mood" (Thelonious Monk) - 4:46
 "Early Alben" - 2:51
 "Startled" - 4:01

Personnel
 Paul Bley – piano

References

Justin Time Records albums
Paul Bley albums
Solo piano jazz albums
2001 albums